Mahtab Keramati (born 17 October 1970) is an Iranian actress. She has received various accolades, including a Crystal Simorgh, two Hafez Awards. In August 2006, she was appointed as UNICEF Goodwill Ambassador in Iran.

Career
Keramati was taking acting courses when she was chosen for the role of Helen in The Men of Angelos, which garnered her national recognition. She later went on to appear in films such as Mummy III and Rain Man for which she was nominated for a Fajr International Film Festival Crystal Simorgh. She then appeared in dramas such as Saint Mary and Crimson Soil and the films Hell, Purgatory, Heaven, There Are Things You Don't Know, Alzheimer and The Private Life of Mr. and Mrs. M.. She won a Crystal Simorgh for Best Actress in a Supporting Role for Twenty. In 2015, she won Best Actor Award Imagineindia Film Festival. She was also featured in Dhaka Film Festival Jury.

Charity and philanthropic activities

After the earthquake of Bam City which occurred on 26 December 2003, she approached philanthropy and charity work and on 30 December she was one of the artists partaking in a charity meeting for quake-stricken people of Bam. From 2013, releasing prisoners-sentenced-to-nemesis, have become one of the charity work she does and she has put some efforts in collecting blood money and getting the next of kin's satisfaction. In this respect Shahab Moradi has been one of her companions.

She is also a women's rights activist.

Filmography

Film 
Mardi Az jense Bolour (1999)
Mumiyayi 3 (2000)
Mard Barani (2000)
Behesht az ane To (2000)
Molaghat ba Tooti (2003)
Shahe Khamoosh (2003)
Hashtpa (2005)
Salvation at 8:20 (2005)
Hess-e Penhan (2007)
The Reward of Silence (2007)
Adam (2007)
Atash-e Sabz (2008)
Shirin (2008)
Tardid (2009)
Women Are Angels (2009)
Doozakh Barzakh Behesht (2009)
Bist (2009)
Shabane Rooz (2010)
Adamkosh (2010)
There Are Things You Don't Know (2010)
Alzheimer (2011)
Absolutely Tame Is a Horse (2011)
The Private Life of Mr. & Mrs. M (2012)
Azar (2012)
The Fourth Child (2013)
Inadvertent (2014)
Hussein Who Said No
Ghosts (2014)
Arghavan (2014)
Jameh Daran (2015)
Ice Age (2015)
BIAFF Film Festival Promo Video 2017 (2017)
 Mazar-i-Sharif
Majan  (2015)
mordad  (2015)
Boht  (2016)
Shayad Eshgh Nabod  (2016)
old Road  (2016)
orca  (2019)
Sahneh Zani (2020)

Television series 
 The Men of Angelos (1998)
 Saint Mary (2002)
 Khake Sorkh (2002)

Producer
Orca (2019)
Platform (2017)
Take Off (2017)

References

External links

Living people
1970 births
People from Tehran
Artistic directors
HIV/AIDS activists
Actresses from Tehran
Iranian humanitarians
Iranian businesspeople
Iranian film producers
Iranian film actresses
Iranian stage actresses
Iranian women in business
UNESCO Goodwill Ambassadors
UNICEF Goodwill Ambassadors
Children's rights activists
Iranian television actresses
Iranian women film producers
20th-century Iranian actresses
21st-century Iranian actresses
Islamic Azad University alumni
Iranian women's rights activists
Crystal Simorgh for Best Supporting Actress winners